Anupama is a 1966 Hindi film directed by Hrishikesh Mukherjee. The movie stars Dharmendra, Sharmila Tagore, Shashikala, Deven Verma and Surekha Pandit. The music was composed by Hemant Kumar. 
At the 1966 National Film Awards it won the National Film Award for Best Feature Film in Hindi.

The film was critically acclaimed and was nominated for four Filmfare Awards and won Filmfare Award for Best Cinematography, B&W. It did "Above Average" business at the Indian Box Office. One of the best Indian movie on father and daughter relationship.

Plot
Mohan Sharma (Tarun Bose), a successful businessman in Bombay, marries Aruna (Surekha Pandit) late in his life. His happy marriage ends when Aruna dies during childbirth, leaving behind a young daughter, Uma (Sharmila Tagore). Mohan cannot bear to see his daughter unless he is drunk, as she is a painful reminder of his late wife. Naturally, Uma grows up all by herself and becomes highly introverted and depressed. As time passes, Mohan's health starts failing due to overwork and alcoholism; doctors suggest a change of weather to a hill station, Mahabaleshwar.

Meanwhile, Arun Mehta (Deven Verma), the son of Mohan's friend Hari Mehta, is set to marry Uma, but prefers Annie (Shashikala) instead. He returns home after studying engineering abroad for five years, and joins them along with his friend, Ashok (Dharmendra), a writer and teacher who due to his straightforward nature most of the time remains jobless. Things change when young Ashok enters Uma's life. Uma falls in love with Ashok but she cannot do anything to jeopardize the already fragile relationship between her and her father who dislikes Ashok. Finally, Uma's father agrees and Uma leaves with Ashok to his village.

Cast
 Dharmendra - Ashok
 Sharmila Tagore - Uma Sharma
 Shashikala - Anita Bakshi 'Annie'
 Tarun Bose - Mohan Sharma
 Dulari - Sarla
 David - Moses
 Deven Verma - Arun Mehta
 Naina - Gauri
 Durga Khote - Ashok's Mother
 Surekha Pandit - Aruna Sharma
 Brahm Bhardwaj - Suresh Bakshi

Production
In an interview, the director shared that film was partly based on the life of his cousin. “My aunt died during childbirth, my uncle became an alcoholic, and he couldn’t stand his daughter" Part of the film, including the hit song, "Kuch Dil Ne Kaha was shot in Mahabaleshwar.

Soundtrack

The music for the movie was composed by Hemant Kumar and the lyrics were written by Kaifi Azmi.  The movie includes many popular songs such as "Dheere Dheere Machal" picturised on Surekha & Tarun Bose, sung by Lata Mangeshkar and composed by Hemant Kumar. "Ya Dil Ki Suno" and "Kuch Dil Ne Kaha" are other memorable songs from this movie.

 Release 

Awards
 1967: Filmfare Award for Best Cinematography: Jaywant Pathare (Black and white category) 
Nominated
 Best Film: Hrishikesh Mukherjee
 Best Director: Hrishikesh Mukherjee
 Best Story: Hrishikesh Mukherjee
 Best Supporting Actress: Shashikala

References

External links
 
 Hrishikesh Mukherjee's best films - Anupama (1966) at Rediff.com''.
 A review of the film by one of its lovers

1960s Hindi-language films
Indian black-and-white films
1966 films
Films directed by Hrishikesh Mukherjee
Films scored by Hemant Kumar
Best Hindi Feature Film National Film Award winners
Films about depression
Films shot in Maharashtra